Thalattu is an 2021 Indian-Tamil-language family drama series starring Krishna, Shruthi Raj and Sri Latha. It premiered on Sun TV on 26 April 2021 available for worldwide streaming on Sun NXT.

Plot
The story of Thalattu revolves around Vijayakrishnan who has never experienced the love of a mother as he was separated from her in his earlier stage.

Vijay who is married to Isaipriya has a beautiful family. He is a very kind on his family. He is a parentless person. He is not aware of his mother. As an abandoned child, Vijay yearns for a mother’s love and thereby strongly dislikes his unknown mother. He is a victim of family betrayal. Life takes a turn when his mother enters their home as a maid. Aware of the truth, can Isai reunite the mother and son. Whether he will recognize his mother or not forms the crux of the story.

Isaipriya's father rejected her owing to her marriage with Vijay. Isaipriya is now united with her father. Isaipriya popularly known as Isai manages to solve all problems and challenges and that forms the story. She is very kind to Thayamma who works as a maid in the family but is actually Vijay's real mother. Thayamma also has an adopted daughter Terasa.

Cast

Main 
 Krishna as Vijayakrishnan (Vijay) Sundaramoorthy* as young Vijayakrishnan
 Shruthi Raj as Isaipriya Vijayakrishnan
 Sri Latha as Thayamma Sundaramoorthy
 Sridevi Ashok as Mayuri (Main Antagonist)
 Sarvesh Raghav as Sundar Vijayakrishnan
 Dharani as Sivagami Muthaiah(Main Antagonist) 
 Rishi Keshav replacement Pollachi Babu as Muthaiah (Antagonist)

Supporting 
 Tharshika as Theresa 
 Sahana Shetty as Devi (Antagonist)
 Vineeth Sundaram as Praveen Kumar "Praveen" (Devi's love interest) 
 Bharatha Naidu as Kokila Manikandan 
 Suresh Joshua as Manikandan "Mani"
 Mohan Sharma as Advocate Eshwara Moorthy  (Isai's father)
 Sunitha as Vidhya Balachandran (Isai's best friend)
 Nathan Shyam replacement Ashwin Kumar as Balachandran (Vidhya's husband)
 K. S. Jayalakshmi as Balachandran's mother (Antagonist)
 Karpagavalli as Krishnaveni
 Arunkumar Padmanabhan as Advocate Vaali(Antagonist) 
 Shravan replacement Rajesh as Rudhramoorthy "Rudhran"
 Nithya Ravindran as Peri Aayi
 Sandra Babu as Young Thayamma Sundaramoorthy 
 Haripriya Isai as Young Sivagami Muthaiah 
 Kiran replacement Bala Komaiah as Young Muthaiah 
 Nila Gracy as Bhavani
 Vincent Roy as Sambasivam 
 Meenakshi as Meenakshi 
 Navindhar as Sukumar Sambasivam
 VJ Malar replacement VJ Mounika as Thaara (deaceased)
 Rekha Angelina as Vasanthi 
 Yaar Kannan as Siluvai
 Sri Kala as Devika 
 Tina as Abi

Special Appearances  
 Santhosh as Young Sundaramoorthy (deceased)
 Delhi Ganesh as Ganapathy Gurukkal
 K. S. G. Venkatesh as Thirugnanasambandar 
 Ganesh Venkatraman as Aravind
 Anuradha Krishnamoorthy as Vasundhara IAS
 Eshwar Ragunathan as Eshwar
 Lavanya as Lakshmi Eshwar

Adaptations

References

External links 
 

Sun TV original programming
2021 Tamil-language television series debuts
Tamil-language melodrama television series
Television shows set in Tamil Nadu
Television series about families
Tamil-language television soap operas